Kısaç can refer to:

 Kisač, Serbia
 Kısaç, Çerkeş
 Kısaç, Orta